Macacine gammaherpesvirus 5 (McHV-5) is a species of virus in the genus Rhadinovirus, subfamily Gammaherpesvirinae, family Herpesviridae, and order Herpesvirales.

References

External links
 

Gammaherpesvirinae